Wali-e-Mewat Raja Khanzada  Akleem Khan, Bahadur, son of Khanzada Bahadur Khan Mewati,  was the Khanzada Rajput ruler of Mewat. from 1412 until 1417. He was succeeded by his brother Khanzada Feroz Khan as Wali-e-Mewat in 1417.

References

 

Mewat
Indian Muslims
Year of birth unknown